SR-142948 is a drug used in scientific research which is a non-peptide antagonist selective for the neurotensin receptors, although not selective between subtypes.

Study 
SR-142948 has been used to study the role of neurotensin in the regulation of dopamine receptor activity and glutamate signalling in the brain.

In animal studies, SR-142948 blocked the effects of stimulant drugs, including MDMA.

References 

Adamantanes
Benzamides
Pyrazoles